Pithiviers internment camp during the Holocaust was a transit camp for Jewish deportees in Pithiviers (Loiret department; roughly  south of Paris and  and north-west of Beaune-la-Rolande.) in Occupied France during the Second World War. Children were separated there from their parents; the adults were processed and deported to concentration camps farther away, usually Auschwitz. This was the fate of the novelist Irène Némirovsky.

The buildings were destroyed during the 1950s for material reasons, not without the agreement of the memorial associations. Only the Infirmary, currently located at 2 rue de Pontournois, has been preserved, to serve as a home. The guard post, at the entrance to the camp, was in the center of what is now Square Max-Jacob, 50 rue de l'Ancien camp, and next to it, a stone monument was erected to honor the accounts of the survivors, and to identify the importance of the location. The internment camp reached from the guard post to the current athletics stadium, which is set back from 14 rue Gabriel-Lelong.

History 
Pithiviers internment camp was the first concentration camp in Vichy France designed to imprison Jews during the Holocaust. (Dachau was the first Nazi concentration camp opened on March 22, 1933 in Germany).

Initially an abandoned train station, the prison camp was created at the start of World War II with the purpose of holding French prisoners of war. (Joseph Darnand, founder and leader of the French Militia, taken prisoner of war on June 19, 1940, was interned at the Pithiviers camp before escaping in August 1940). 

Following the Law on the status of Jews (law of October 3, 1940) which enabled the internment of Jews, the purpose of the Pithiviers internment camp expanded to include Jewish refugees, then German prisoners of war. Jews detained in Pithiviers were mostly Polish expatriates living in the Paris Prefecture. Children were separated there from their parents; the adults were processed and deported to concentration camps farther away.  Inmates were guarded by Vichy officials acting under Nazi supervision and housed across 19 barracks. Pithiviers also held various administrative buildings, including an infirmary and canteen, and a large vegetable garden. Prisoners were forced to work both inside the camp, namely in its workshops and garden, and in outside farms and plants found in the surrounding villages.

The Pithiviers camp was evacuated at the end of September 1942 and transformed into a detention camp for political prisoners until August 1944.

In 2018, France’s national rail company, SNCF, announced the allocation $2.3 million toward construction of a new museum expected to open in 2020 at the one-time camp site. With SNCF’s logistical support, some 16,000 Jews were sent to be murdered in death camps from Pithiviers station and the neighboring camp of Beaune-la-Rolande in eight transports between 1941 and 1943. SNCF made plans to work in conjunction with CRIF, an umbrella group representing French Jewish communities, to restore the dilapidated Pithiviers rail station to its wartime appearance. Educational materials, including an exhibition center detailing the internment of Europe’s Jews and study rooms for visitors and school children, will be housed within the station-turned-museum. (No information on the status of this museum is found at this time)

A "Memorial of the deportation of the Pithivier and Beaune la Rolande camps" is located at Square Max Jacob, 45300 Pithiviers, France.

Deportation of Jews 
From September 1940, under German orders, French authorities identified and maintained lists of Jews and violently plundered their belongings. Shortly thereafter, the Vichy regime publicly proclaimed the Law on the status of Jews (law of October 3, 1940) which enforced the internment of Jews.  Theodor Dannecker, representative of Adolf Eichmann in Paris from September 1940 to August 1942, and Carltheo Zeitschel worked together to accelerate the exclusion of Jews by removing them from society. On April 22, 1941, Theodor Dannecker informed the regional prefect Jean-Pierre Ingrand (1905-1992), representative of the Ministry of the Interior in the occupied zone, of the transformation of the Pithiviers prison camp into an internment camp, with transfer of its management to the French authorities. 

The Vichy government thus transformed the prisoner of war camp into an internment camp for the Jews arrested during the roundups. Specifically the Green Ticket Roundup (also known as the Greenback Scoop) on May 14, 1941, and then the Vel d'Hiv roundups of July 16 and 17, 1942.

When the Pithiviers internment camp was full, the Beaune-la-Rolande internment camp was identified to allow for a total capacity of 5000 Jews. Six convoys set out from Pithiviers on June 25, July 17 (6th convoy), July 31, August 3 and September 21, 1942, transporting 6,079 Jews to Auschwitz. There were only 115 survivors of Pithiviers internment camp, or 1.8% of the deportees.

Arrested on July 13, 1942, the novelist Irène Némirovsky, author of the unfinished novel Suite française, was transported there on July 15, 1942 before being deported on July 17 to Auschwitz by the 6th convoy. She died there a month later of the flu (according to the camp certificate), more likely of typhus.

Convoys 
The following convoys left from the Pithiviers internment camp to deliver Jews to Auschwitz:

 Convoy 4 of June 25, 1942 (999 prisoners)
 Convoy 6 of July 17 1942 (928 prisoners)
 Convoy 13 of July 31, 1942 (1049 prisoners)
 Convoy 14 of August 3, 1942 (1034 prisoners)
 Convoy 16 of August 7, 1942 (1069 prisoners)
 Convoy 35 of September 21, 1942 (1000 prisoners)

See also
 Antisemitism in France
 Fall of France
 French Jews
 History of the Jews in France
 Timeline of deportations of French Jews to death camps

References

Sources
 

Content in this edit is translated from the existing French Wikipedia article Pithiviers internment camp; see its history for attribution.

Buildings and structures in Loiret
World War II internment camps in France
Nazi concentration camps in France
Deportation
Vichy France